Ma On Shan Town Centre, formerly called Sunshine City, is one of the 36 constituencies in the Sha Tin District in Hong Kong.

The constituency returns one district councillor to the Sha Tin District Council, with an election every four years. The seat has been currently held by Independent Chung Lai-him.

Ma On Shan Town Centre constituency is loosely based on part of the Sunshine City, Bayshore Towers and Villa Oceania in Ma On Shan with an estimated population of 17,520.

Councillors represented

Election results

2010s

2000s

1990s

References

Ma On Shan
Constituencies of Hong Kong
Constituencies of Sha Tin District Council
2011 establishments in Hong Kong
Constituencies established in 2011
1999 establishments in Hong Kong
Constituencies established in 1999